Wooden church architecture in Ukraine dates from the beginning of Christianity in the area and comprises a set of unique styles and forms specific to many sub-regions of the country. As a form of vernacular culture, construction of the churches in specific styles is passed on to subsequent generations. The architectural styles vary from very simple to complicated, involving a highly skilled carpentry and exceptional artistry in wood-cutting.

Aside from tserkvas (Greek Catholic or Eastern Orthodox churches), there are quite a few kosciols (Latin Catholic churches) that are preserved in Western Ukraine. Some of these churches remain in active use.

General overview
Nearly 1,900 wooden churches have been identified in Ukraine . When Ukrainians emigrated to the New World in the late 19th century, many used these stylistic forms but adapted their construction to the new materials and new environmental conditions (see for example the Holy Trinity Cathedral in Chicago, Illinois). According to the Director of the Lviv National Art Gallery, Borys Voznytsky, the current situation in the preservation of the unique churches in Ukraine is extremely difficult. Fewer churches burnt down in Western Ukraine during the Soviet era than have burnt down in the post-Soviet period.

Wooden churches of Central and Eastern Ukraine 

The wooden church architecture of Central and Eastern Ukraine finds its roots in the first millennium of Christianity in Ukraine from the time of Vladimir the Great (Grand Prince of Kiev from 980 to 1015). While masonry churches prevailed in urban areas, wooden church architecture continued primarily in Ukrainian villages of central and eastern Ukraine. Unlike western Ukraine, there is no clear separation of style based on region. Central Ukrainian churches are similar to the multi-chamber masonry churches of Kievan Rus' but are, instead, constructed in wood. Both framed construction and nail-less styles are also represented.

Wooden churches of Western Ukraine 

Relatively isolated peasant cultures in western and Transcarpathian Ukraine were able to maintain construction into the early 20th century in wooden styles. Many ethnographic regions maintained specific styles of architecture aligned to their cultural, environmental and historical differences.

Common to all the regions, in some way, are two techniques of roofing: opasannia, the structure supporting the roof formed from projecting logs from top corners of log walls and pidashshia, a style using opasannia supports, but extending the roofing far enough to form a continuous overhang of the roof around the church perimeter.

The Lviv region alone has 999 churches that are registered monuments of architecture - 398 of which are of national importance - however only 16 of those thousand churches have fire-alarm systems. During the post-Soviet era, the Lviv region has already lost some 80 churches to fires. In 2009 the government of the region granted approximately ₴2 million to finance restoration projects of the churches.
Bukovina
The traditional Bukovinian church features a tall gabled roof, but often terminates in splayed roof over the polygonal sanctuary.  The roofwork features opasannia and was covered in wooden shingles.  The structure was usually built from logs but was often covered in clay and whitewashed, similar to Bukovinian-style homes. 
Lemko
Lemko churches most often used a three-section design with very tall gabled roofs and a tower over each section, with the tower over the entrance being the tallest.  Topping each tower is a spire, resembling a Gothic spire, albeit constructed in Ukrainian style.
Hutsul
Hutsul churches most often were 5-section cruciform structures, using spruce logs to form walls with opasannia type arcades.  The central dome is formed in an octahedral shape with a splayed roof, instead of an onion dome.
Also unique to Hutsul churches is the use of tin or metalwork in the upper parts of the church, which are also used in home architecture of the region.
Boyko
Boyko churches are defined by their three section design, with the central nave being the largest.  Intricate, multi-tiered and shingled roofwork is the most distinguishing factor in Boyko church design.  The structures used the most traditional techniques, having both frameless walls and rafterless roofs as well as using opasannia and piddashshia.
Ternopil
Ternopil construction styles are considered a mix of Carpathian and Kiev styles.  Two styles prevail: Ternopil Nave Style and Ternopil Cruciform Style.  The nave style used a long rectangular shape with gabled roofing on opposite ends with a small decorative onion dome, often not visible from inside the church. The cruciform style uses an equidistant cruciform pattern with a structural central onion dome, and gabled roofing over each cruciform section.  While constructed in wood in villages, this style often used masonry in urban areas.

List of wooden churches in Ukraine 

Apşiţa (Voditsa in Ukrainian, Kisapsa in Hungarian)
Apşa de Mijloc, Susani (Sredneye Vodyanoye is Ukrainian, Középapsa in Hungarian)
Apşa de Mijloc, Josani 
Apşa din Jos, Părău (Verkhnye Vodyane is Ukrainian, Alsóapsa in Hungarian)
Danylovo (Dănileşti in Romanian, Husztsófalva in Hungarian)
Dulovo (Duleni in Romanian, Dulfalva in Hungarian)
Ganychi (Găneşti in Romanian, Gánya in Hungarian)
Holy Trinity Church, Zhovkva
Kobyletska Poliana (Poiana Cobilei in Romanian and Gyertyánliget in Hungarian)
Kolodne (Darva in Romanian and Hungarian)
Krainykovo (formerly Steblivka between 19120–1938 and 1945–1946, Mihálka in Hungarian, Crainiceni in Romanian)
Neresnytsia (Nereşniţa in Romanian, Nyéresháza in Hungarian)
Nyzhnie Selyshche (Săliştea de Jos in Romanian, Alsószelistye in Hungarian)
Olexandrivka (Sândreni in Romanian, Sándorfalva in Hungarian)
Ruska Pole I (Domneştii Mari in Romanian, Úrmező in Hungarian)
Ruska Pole II
Sokyrnytsya (Săclânţa in Romanian, Szeklencze in Hungarian)
Steblivka (Duboşari in Romanian, Száldobos in Hungarian)
Ternovo (Târnova in Romanian, Kökényes in Hungarian)

List of wooden churches in Zakarpattia Oblast 

 Sredne Vodyane churches
 Verkhnye Vodyane church
 Danylovo church
 Kolodne church
 Krainykovo church
 Nyzhnie Selyshche church
 Olexandrivka church
 Sokyrnytsya church
 Steblivka church

See also 

 Carpathian Wooden Churches
 Wooden Tserkvas of Carpathian Region in Poland and Ukraine
 Wooden Churches of Southern Little Poland
 Wooden Churches of the Slovak Carpathians
 Wooden Churches of Maramureş in Romania
 Vernacular architecture of the Carpathians
 Stave church, wooden churches of Scandinavia

References

External links 
 Wooden Churches of Ukraine
 Wooden Churches of the Rusyns
 Wooden churches of Lviv Region

Bibliography
 Rescuing the Hidden European Wooden Churches Heritage an International Methodology for Implementing a Database for Restoration Projects. Ukraine (Kharkov State Technical University of Construction and Architecture) ... Actual Restoration and Preservation Problems of the Ukrainian Wooden Churches
 Rotoff, Basil. Monuments to Faith: Ukrainian Churches in Manitoba. University of Manitoba Press, 1990.
 Shcherbakivskyĭ, Danylo. Ukraïnsʹke mystetstvo/L'art de l'Ukraïne. Kyĭv : Praha : Ukraïnskyĭ hromadskyí vydavnychyĭ fond, 1913.